Creuddyn Peninsula is the geographical term for a small peninsula in the county borough of Conwy in Wales. It includes Llandudno, Rhos-on-Sea, Deganwy, Penrhyn Bay and Llandudno Junction. The combined population of the peninsula is 38,952.
It is bordered roughly by the Irish Sea, the River Conwy, Conwy Bay and the A55 expressway.

The Great Orme lies at the end of the peninsula, and nearby is the Little Orme. There are several limestone hills of around 100 metres in height, including Bryn Euryn, Bryn Pydew, Mynydd Pant, Coed Gaer, Bryniau, and Deganwy Castle. The Great Orme reaches 207 metres, and the Little Orme 141 metres.
The area is usually called simply Y Creuddyn, being the Welsh name of the medieval commote (an administrative unit within a cantref) roughly corresponding to the peninsula itself, though somewhat larger.

The Welsh-medium secondary school Ysgol y Creuddyn is situated on the peninsula.

See also
List of places on the Creuddyn peninsula for a list of settlements.

References

Peninsulas of Wales
Landforms of Conwy County Borough